Honduran Sign Language, also known as "Lengua de Señas Hondureñas" (LESHO), is the dominant sign language used in Honduras.  American Sign Language is also used; the two are not related.

References

Languages of Honduras
Sign languages
Sign languages of Honduras